Creation Stories is a 2021 British biographical film about Alan McGee and Creation Records, directed by Nick Moran. The film was adapted from McGee's 2013 autobiography of the same name, by Irvine Welsh and Dean Cavanagh.

Creation Stories premiered at the virtual Glasgow Film Festival on 24 February 2021, and went on general release on 20 March.

Cast
Ewen Bremner as Alan McGee
Suki Waterhouse as Gemma
Jason Isaacs as Ralph
Rebecca Root as Vicky
Joanna Pickering as Mary
Thomas Turgoose as Dick Green
Mel Raido as Ed Ball
Danny John-Jules as Maurice
Paul Kaye as Mitch
Saskia Reeves as Helen
Carl Barât as Griff
Irvine Welsh as Titch
Jason Flemyng as King Tuts Promoter
Steven Berkoff as Aleister Crowley
Nick Moran as Malcolm McLaren
Ed Byrne as Alastair Campbell
Alistair McGowan as Jimmy Savile

Release
In June 2021, RLJE Films bought distribution rights to release Creation Stories in the United States.

References

External links

2021 films
British biographical films
Films about music and musicians
Films based on autobiographies
2020s English-language films
2020s biographical films
Films directed by Nick Moran
2020s British films
Creation Records
Works about the music industry